Valeri Borisovich Zykov (born 24 February 1944) is a former Soviet football player. Since 1991 he works for the FC Dynamo Moscow retired former players organization.

Honours
 Soviet Cup winner: 1967, 1970.

International career
Zykov made his debut for USSR on 6 May 1970 in a friendly against Bulgaria. He also played in UEFA Euro 1972 qualifiers (he did not play in the final tournament).

External links
  Profile 

1944 births
Sportspeople from Nizhny Novgorod
Living people
Russian footballers
Soviet footballers
Soviet Union international footballers
FC Dynamo Moscow players
Soviet Top League players
1970 FIFA World Cup players
Association football defenders
FC Volga Nizhny Novgorod players